Manteno State Hospital (formerly Manteno State Mental Hospital) was a psychiatric hospital located in rural Manteno Township in Kankakee County, Illinois.

Founding
The facility was authorized in 1927 by the 55th Illinois General Assembly with its first patients arriving in December 1930. In 1954, the patient population peaked at 8,195. In 1983, the facility was authorized for closure by Governor James R. Thompson and closed on December 31, 1985.

History
In October 1986, the Illinois Veterans home at Manteno was dedicated and still operates on a portion of the grounds of the original psychiatric facility while numerous other building have been demolished. There are very few buildings left; for example, the Morgan Cottage is left along with the sewage plant. These buildings are abandoned but left in original condition. Many other buildings have been renovated for other uses as of July 2009. The site was redeveloped as a VA home, an industrial park, and a portion of the grounds is now the Manteno Municipal golf course. A state hospital cemetery is to the east of the site.  The grounds are the now the home of numerous housing developments including a residential treatment center for males and females ages 12 to 21 called Indian Oaks Academy, which is a member of the Nexus family of treatment programs.

See also
List of Veterans Affairs medical facilities
Jerome Y. Lettvin, head psychiatrist circa 1950

References

External links 
Manteno Madness Time magazine, Monday, October 23, 1939 (Typhoid outbreak)
The Manteno Project
Manteno State Hospital at the Legends and Lore of Illinois
Illinois Veterans Home - Manteno
Nursing home Violations 2001
Nov 2001 press release
FY00 Audit
Indian Oaks Academy
Asylum Projects Manteno info & history

Hospital buildings completed in 1930
1985 disestablishments in Illinois
Buildings and structures in Kankakee County, Illinois
Defunct hospitals in Illinois
Hospitals established in 1930
Hospitals disestablished in 1985
Psychiatric hospitals in Illinois